The Supremes Sing Country, Western & Pop is the fourth studio album recorded by the Supremes, issued by Motown in February 1965. The album was presented as a covers/tribute album of country songs, as Ray Charles had done with his album  Modern Sounds in Country and Western Music. However, over half of the selections on The Supremes Sing Country, Western & Pop were written in-house by Motown staffer Clarence Paul. One of the songs on the album is "My Heart Can't Take It No More", which the Supremes had recorded in 1962 and released in 1963 as a single.

One of Paul's songwriting partners on the album was his fourteen-year-old charge Stevie Wonder, making the Supremes the first act besides Wonder himself to record Wonder's songs.

Motown's session group, the Andantes, appear on all but two of the tracks. They accompany Ross completely above Wilson and Ballard on "Baby Doll".

The album was a modest success peaking at number 79 on the US Billboard Top LPs chart, with sales exceeding 38,000 copies.

Track listing

Side One
"Funny How Time Slips Away" (Willie Nelson, originally by Nelson)
"My Heart Can't Take It No More" (Clarence Paul)
"It Makes No Difference Now" (Floyd Tillman, originally by Eddy Arnold)
"You Didn't Care" (Paul)
"Tears in Vain" (Paul)

Side Two
"Tumbling Tumbleweeds" (Bob Nolan, originally by Sons of the Pioneers)
"Lazy Bones" (Johnny Mercer, Hoagy Carmichael)
"You Need Me" (Paul)
"Baby Doll" (Paul, Stevie Wonder)
"Sunset" (Paul, Wonder)
"(The Man With the) Rock and Roll Banjo Band" (Paul, Berry Gordy, Jr.)

Personnel
 Diana Ross, Florence Ballard and Mary Wilson - lead and background vocals
 Clarence Paul - producer
 Lawrence Horn - co-producer on "My Heart Can't Take It No More"
 The Andantes and other vocalists - additional background vocals
 Cranford Nix, Sr. - banjo (some tracks)

Singles history
"My Heart Can't Take It No More" b/w "You Bring Back Memories" (from Meet the Supremes) (Motown 1040, February 2, 1963)

Chart history

References

1965 albums
The Supremes albums
Covers albums
Country albums by American artists
Albums produced by Clarence Paul
Motown albums
Albums recorded at Hitsville U.S.A.